Siaha (official name given by the Mara Autonomous District Council, popularly known as Saiha) is a census town in Siaha district in the Indian north-eastern state of Mizoram. It is the Headquarters of the Mara Autonomous District Council, one of the three autonomous district councils within Mizoram. It is located in the South Central part of the state. The word 'Siaha' in the local Mara language comes from 'Sia' for Masia which means elephant and 'ha' meaning tooth - An elephant tooth. It was a place where a large amount of elephant teeth were found. Though the local people name the town as Siaha, Mizos called it by the name 'Saiha', which is purely a translated term in Mizo language.

Siaha is a commercial hub for Mara people.

Geography
The average elevation is 729 metres (2391 feet).

Demographics
 India census, Siaha had a population of 19,731. Males constitute 52% of the population and females 48%. Siaha has an average literacy rate of 79%, higher than the national average of 59.5%: male literacy is 80%, and female literacy is 77%. In Siaha, 16% of the population is under 6 years of age. Siaha is the fastest growing town in Mizoram, 2008 statistical handbook of Mizoram reveals that the town has a population of 29,275 in 2008 against 19,731 in 2001.

Education 
There is one college - Saiha College Siaha, under Mizoram University and a number of public and private schools.

Transport
A Helicopter service by Pawan Hans has been started which connects the Aizawl  with Siaha. The Distance between Siaha and Aizawl through NH 54 is 378 km and is connected with regular service of Bus and Jeeps.

Media
The Major Newspapers in Saiha are:
 Buannel
 Chhim Aw
 Kawl Eng
 Maraland
 Moonlight 
 Mara Thlala
 Siaha Post
 Saikhawpui
 Siaha Times
 Awsicharu [awsicharu.wordpress.com]
 Deiva Mara Daily Deiva Mara Daily

References

External links 
  District Website Siaha
 Maraland.NET : Mara people's Online site
 SiahaOnline.com : Siaha Online website

 
Cities and towns in Saiha district